Sergio 'Queco' Piña Cousillas (born 17 July 1980) is a Spanish former footballer who played as a goalkeeper.

In a 19-year senior career, he appeared in 84 Segunda División matches over seven seasons, representing Racing de Ferrol, Alicante, Ponferradina, Leganés and Huesca.

Club career
Born in A Coruña, Galicia, Piña finished his youth career with Deportivo de La Coruña, and made his senior debut while on loan to amateurs Sporting Meicende. He returned to the former in summer 1999, and was immediately assigned to the reserves.

Piña signed with another reserve team in 2000, Celta de Vigo B of the Segunda División B. Two years later, he moved to CD Ourense also in division three, being sparingly used in his only season. He then joined Tercera División team CD Lalín in June 2003, where he won the Ricardo Zamora Trophy.

In July 2004, Piña signed for Racing de Ferrol. He played his first game as a professional on 12 March 2005, replacing the injured Miguel Escalona in a 1–2 home loss against RC Celta de Vigo in the Segunda División. He was handed his first start on 12 June, in a home defeat to Xerez CD (same score).

Piña featured rarely for the Diaños Verdes in his first two seasons, suffering second-tier relegation in the second, but started in the 2006–07 and 2007–08 campaigns, the latter again spent in the second division. On 1 September 2008 he joined Alicante CF of the same league, being relegated in his first and only season.

On 23 June 2010, after more than a year without a club, Piña signed a one-year deal with SD Ponferradina. On 16 February of the following year he returned to Celta, again competing solely with the B side in the second tier. On 15 April 2012, whilst at the service of the latter, he scored through a goal kick in a 2–2 home draw against Rayo Vallecano B.

On 29 December 2012, Piña moved to Orihuela CF also in division three. On 9 January 2014 he joined another club in that league, CD Leganés.

Piña achieved two promotions with the Madrilenians; in the last season, however, he failed to appear in a single match, playing second-fiddle to Jon Ander Serantes. He was released after his contract expired in July 2016, and signed with SD Huesca on 5 August.

On 20 October 2017, Piña returned to Leganés as a goalkeeper coach.

Personal life
Piña's father, Ramón, was also a footballer. A defender, he played with Deportivo in the 70s/80s.

References

External links

1980 births
Living people
Spanish footballers
Footballers from A Coruña
Association football goalkeepers
Segunda División players
Segunda División B players
Tercera División players
Deportivo Fabril players
Celta de Vigo B players
CD Ourense footballers
Racing de Ferrol footballers
Alicante CF footballers
SD Ponferradina players
Orihuela CF players
CD Leganés players
SD Huesca footballers